is a former Japanese football player.

Playing career
Odajima was born in Chigasaki on September 15, 1977. After graduating from Chuo University, he joined J2 League club Montedio Yamagata in 2000. He played many matches as center back in first season. However he could not play at all in the match in 2001. In 2002, he moved to Prefectural Leagues club Thespa Kusatsu. He played many matches and the club was promoted to Regional Leagues from 2003, Japan Football League from 2004 and J2 League from 2005. He retired end of 2005 season.

Club statistics

References

External links

1977 births
Living people
Chuo University alumni
Association football people from Kanagawa Prefecture
Japanese footballers
J2 League players
Japan Football League players
Montedio Yamagata players
Thespakusatsu Gunma players
Association football defenders